Nereo Svara (born 20 September 2020) is a former Italian hurdler who competed at the 1960 Summer Olympics.

References

External links
 

1935 births
Living people
Italian male hurdlers
Olympic athletes of Italy
Athletes (track and field) at the 1960 Summer Olympics
Universiade silver medalists for Italy
Universiade medalists in athletics (track and field)
Medalists at the 1959 Summer Universiade